In telephony, an international gateway exchange is a telephone switch that forms the gateway between a national telephone network and one or more other international gateway exchanges, thus providing cross-border connectivity.

Requirements 
Whereas international gateway exchanges are commonly implemented using hardware that could also serve to build a Class 4 (national transit) switch, some of the differences between an international gateway exchange and a Class 4 switch include:

 International variants of signalling protocols, such as International ISUP and #5, in addition to the relevant national signalling protocols.
 Support for echo cancellers.
 Support for DCME
 Support for international accounting and settlement agreements.
 Support for A-law/mu-law transcoding
 High capacity (some of the largest telephone exchanges in the world are international gateway exchanges).
 Support for the numbering plans of each of the countries that may be dialed.
 Advanced traffic routing capabilities, in order to take advantage of the best available tariffs for each destination.

Telephone exchanges